Amina Mohamed Abdi (21 October 1981 – 23 March 2022) was a Somali politician, she was an MP in the Federal Parliament of Somalia from 2012 till her death, as a member of the opposition Union for Peace and Development Party.

Life
Amina Mohamed Abdi was from the Hawiye, gaaljecel clan. She attended school in Mogadishu, and remembered, aged eight, returning from school to find her house empty and her family gone as the Somali Civil War fighting broke out in 1992. She later lived with her uncle, himself a member of the Somali parliament.

In 2012, aged 24, Abdi stood for parliament. She defied clan elders to do so, facing down objections that in doing so she was behaving like a prostitute. Defeating two other candidates, she won a seat reserved for women.

In the 2016 Somali parliamentary election, Abdi won an open parliamentary seat in Hiran, Somalia.

Abdi was preparing to be a candidate in the parliamentary elections scheduled for February 2021, defending her seat against five men. However, the elections were postponed amidst disagreement over the voting process. 

She was an advocate for an investigation into the disappearance of Ikran Tahlil Farah.

Assassination 

On 23 March 2022, an al-Shabaab suicide bomber targeted a vehicle carrying Amina and her bodyguards in Beledweyne, as she was campaigning for re-election. When the casualties were taken to hospital, a suicide car bomb exploded. Amina was killed during the attack. She was just 40 years old. The attacks also killed 47 more people and injured 105.

References

1981 births
2022 deaths
Deaths by car bomb in Somalia
Members of the Federal Parliament of Somalia
21st-century Somalian women politicians
21st-century Somalian politicians
Terrorism victims
People from Hiran, Somalia
Assassinated Somalian politicians
Terrorism deaths in Somalia